The 1981 European Aquatics Championships were held in an indoor pool (50 m) in Split, Yugoslavia from 5 September to 12 September 1981. Besides swimming there were titles contested in diving, synchronized swimming (women) and water polo (men).

Medal table

Swimming

Men's events

Women's events

Diving

Men's events

Women's events

Synchronized swimming

Water polo

References

LEN European Aquatics Championships
European Aquatics Championships, 1981
European Aquatics Championships, 1981
International aquatics competitions hosted by Yugoslavia
European Aquatics
Swimming competitions in Yugoslavia
Diving competitions in Yugoslavia
September 1981 sports events in Europe